Rear Admiral Judith Helen "Jude" Terry  is a senior Royal Navy officer. In May 2021, it was announced that she would be promoted to rear admiral in 2022, thereby becoming the first woman to hold flag rank in the Royal Navy. She became Naval Secretary and Director of People and Training.

Personal life
Terry was born in Jersey, and was educated at Jersey College for Girls, a fee-paying school on the island. She studied anatomical sciences at the University of Dundee, graduating with a Bachelor of Science (BSc) degree in 1997.

Naval career
Terry was commissioned into the Royal Navy on 17 September 1997. She was promoted to commander on 30 June 2014. She served for three years at Permanent Joint Headquarters, for which she was appointed an Officer of the Order of the British Empire (OBE) in the 2017 New Year Honours. She was promoted to commodore on 8 March 2021, and to rear admiral on 12 January 2022.

See also
 List of senior female officers of the British Armed Forces

References

Living people
Year of birth missing (living people)
Jersey people
Royal Navy admirals
Jersey military personnel
Women in the Royal Navy
Officers of the Order of the British Empire
People educated at the Jersey College for Girls
Alumni of the University of Dundee
20th-century Royal Navy personnel
21st-century Royal Navy personnel